Gjirokastër Gymnasium, also known as Asim Zeneli Gymnasium  is a gymnasium located in Gjirokastër, Albania. The school was founded on 5 November 1923 as one of the first schools of general secondary education in Albania, where students could study regardless of religion, gender and locality.

References 

Educational institutions established in 1923
Gymnasiums in Albania
Buildings and structures in Gjirokastër
1923 establishments in Albania
Schools in Gjirokastër